Maurice Antonio Ferré (June 23, 1935 – September 19, 2019) was an American politician who served six terms as the Mayor of Miami. Ferré was the first Puerto Rican-born United States mayor and the first Latino Mayor of Miami.  He was an unsuccessful candidate in the 2010 elections for the U.S. Senate seat for Florida vacated by Mel Martínez for the Democratic primary.

Early years

Ferré was born in Ponce, Puerto Rico.  He was the son of businessman José Ferré and nephew of governor of Puerto Rico Luis A. Ferré (1904–2003).  Ferre's father José visited Miami, Florida in the 1920s and wondered why the city did not have any tall buildings. He then ventured into construction and real estate development in Miami. Ferré was born when José and his family returned to their hometown, Ponce in Puerto Rico. Ferré was a graduate of the University of Miami.

Ferré served in the Florida House of Representatives from 1967 to 1968. He served as mayor of Miami from 1973 to 1985.

From 1993 to 1993, Ferré served in the Miami-Dade County Board of Commissioners and was Vice-Chairman of the Miami-Dade County Board of Commissioners.  He was active in national political campaigns, and was a member of several presidential advisory boards. Ferré also worked as a banker and business consultant, and held various research and teaching posts.

On December 20, 1995, Francisco Ferré Malaussena, Mariana Gómez de Ferré, and Felipe Antonio Ferré Gómez, the son, daughter-in-law, and grandson of Ferré, died when American Airlines Flight 965 crashed into a mountain in Colombia.

Ferré ran for mayor of Miami-Dade County in 1996, finishing in third against fellow Commissioners Alex Penelas and Arthur Teele. Ferré won 20% and did not make it to the runoff.

In November 2001, Ferré lost his bid to be reelected Mayor of Miami.

Ferré attempted his second run for mayor of Miami-Dade County in 2004; however, he won only 17.76% of the vote, and did not make the run-off.

Later years

Ferré was on a fellowship at Princeton University and was writing a book about the contributions that Hispanics have made to American culture. Ferré was one of the driving forces behind the intermestic (an abbreviation of international and domestic) dialogue, which attempts to seek consensus regarding Puerto Rico's political status problem from both an international and domestic vantage point. He spoke about this effort to deal with Puerto Rico's political status in an address to the Puerto Rico Senate as keynote speaker during the Governors' Day special session on February 16, 2006.

In October 2009, Ferré announced that he was running for the open U.S. Senate seat of Mel Martinez. He finished in fourth place (last place) in the Democratic primary, with only 4.9% of the vote.

Ferré is sometimes referred to as the "father of modern-day Miami." To pay tribute to him and his legacy, a park district in Miami, formerly called Museum Park, was named after him in early 2019.

Ferré died in Miami on September 19, 2019, from spinal cancer. He was 84 years of age.

See also

List of Puerto Ricans

References

1935 births
2019 deaths
American politicians of Puerto Rican descent
Hispanic and Latino American mayors in Florida
Mayors of Miami
County commissioners in Florida
Democratic Party members of the Florida House of Representatives
Politicians from Ponce
Puerto Rican people of Catalan descent
University of Miami alumni
Neurological disease deaths in Florida
Deaths from cancer in Florida
Deaths from spinal cancer